William Gardell Jr. (born August 20, 1969) is an American actor and stand-up comedian. Gardell played Chicago police officer Mike Biggs on Mike & Molly. He also had a recurring role as Billy Colivida on Yes, Dear and appeared in a dozen episodes of My Name Is Earl as a police officer. Gardell voiced Santa in Ice Age: A Mammoth Christmas, as well as starring on Sullivan & Son in the recurring role of Lyle Winkler. Since 2019, Gardell has played Bob Wheeler in the CBS sitcom series Bob Hearts Abishola.

Early life
Born in Swissvale, Pennsylvania, Gardell attended Winter Park High School in Orange County, Florida, during 1985. As a child, he moved to Florida with his mother and younger siblings after his parents divorced. After that, he only visited Pennsylvania in the summers. He has said living in Florida was a positive experience. At the age of 15, he started working at a department store warehouse in the receiving area where he would unload trucks and stack pallets. In 1987, he started cleaning bathrooms, seating people, and answering phones at a local comedy club, Bonkerz. On December 28, he started performing at the comedy club's open-mic nights after he made a dare with some co-workers. "If I didn't do an open mic night, I couldn't cover the bet. I was running my mouth that I would do it. They bet me I wouldn't," he explained. He eventually started opening for Dennis Miller and George Carlin.

Gardell was a member of International Thespian Society Troupe 850, whose other notable alumni include Amanda Bearse, who is a fellow graduate of Winter Park High School, and Ben Rock of The Blair Witch Project.

Career
Gardell is known for his comedic roles and is influenced by Jackie Gleason. He has also listed Richard Pryor, George Carlin, John Candy, and John Belushi as his influences. Although Bonkerz helped launch his comedy career, he has credited the support from his grandmother, saying: "She told me when I was 8 years old that I could be a comic". Before Mike & Molly, Gardell revealed that he considered a career in radio after being on the road for his comedy act began to affect his family time. He has performed in several feature films, including Bad Santa (with Billy Bob Thornton) You, Me, and Dupree (with Owen Wilson) and Avenging Angelo (with Sylvester Stallone and Anthony Quinn) as well as appearing numerous times in recurring roles in several US television series, including NBC's Heist, The Practice, Yes, Dear, Desperate Housewives, Lucky, Bones, My Name Is Earl, Monk, and The King of Queens. Gardell appeared as himself on the Comedy Central series Make Me Laugh. Subsequently, he appeared on Miller's television program Dennis Miller, telecast on the US financial news network CNBC (conducting "man-on-the-street" interviews). Notably, he created and staged a SNL-style charity performance of a piece called Winter Park Live, the proceeds from which were donated to Comic Relief.

Gardell continues to make weekly appearances on hometown local radio station WDVE, appearing on The DVE Morning Show. Gardell also appeared on Chelsea Lately, as a roundtable participant. Gardell appeared on a special for Comedy Central Presents in 2007 that aired on April 4, 2008. Gardell also played the host of Pizza Talk, an imaginary TV series, in commercials for Round Table Pizza. In 2006, Gardell's first comedy album, Billy Gardell: Throwback, was released.

From September 2010 to May 2016, Gardell starred in Mike & Molly, alongside Melissa McCarthy. In November 2011, he lent his voice to Santa in Ice Age: A Mammoth Christmas. His stand-up special Halftime was released in 2011 and aired on Comedy Central. It was filmed in Pittsburgh and profiles working-class America. As of 2011, he continues to tour as a stand-up comedian in addition to acting. In a 2011 Orlando Sentinel article, Gardell said he wouldn't mind doing movies again.

In 2013, Gardell's comedy special Billy Gardell Presents Road Dogs premiered on Showtime. In 2015, Gardell started the lottery game show Monopoly Millionaires' Club, featuring contestants who bought tickets for the Monopoly Millionaires' Club lottery game; the latter began on October 19, 2014.

Since 2018, Gardell has recurred on the CBS spinoff sitcom Young Sheldon as neighbor Herschel Sparks. In October 2018, he was cast as Bob in the CBS pilot of Bob Hearts Abishola, alongside Folake Olowofoyeku. In May 2019, the series was ordered, and it premiered in September 2019.

Gardell began appearing in advertisements for A1C medication Ozempic in 2021. This followed his involvement in the Ozempic reality series “My Type 2 Transformation” two years previous.

Personal life
Gardell has been married to Patty Knight since 2001. They have a son, William III, born in 2003. In a 2011 USA Today article, Gardell had said he may retire when his son is a teenager to spend more time with him. His parents still live in Florida, where he occasionally visits them.

Gardell is a Pittsburgh Steelers fan and attended games at Heinz Field. His favorite player growing up was Jack Lambert. 

In 2022, during an interview with Entertainment Tonight, he discussed his weight loss and said that he reduced his weight to 212 pounds (96 kg). Gardell managed his weight loss by changing his lifestyle and having bariatric surgery.

Filmography

Film

Television

Comedy specials

References

External links
 
 
 Billy Gardell at dve.com

1969 births
Living people
People from Swissvale, Pennsylvania
American stand-up comedians
American game show hosts
American male voice actors
American male comedians
American male film actors
American male television actors
21st-century American male actors
Male actors from Pennsylvania
Male actors from Florida
20th-century American male actors
Winter Park High School alumni
20th-century American comedians
21st-century American comedians
Comedians from Pennsylvania